The National Advisory Commission on Civil Disorders, known as the Kerner Commission after its chair, Governor Otto Kerner Jr. of Illinois, was an 11-member Presidential Commission established in July 1967 by President Lyndon B. Johnson in  to investigate the causes of urban riots in the United States during the summer of 1967, and to provide recommendations to the government for the future.

The report was released in 1968, after seven months of investigation. It attributed the riots to lack of economic opportunity for African Americans and Latinos, failed social service programs, police brutality, racism, and the orientation of national media to white perspectives. The 426-page report was a bestseller.

Background 

President Johnson appointed the commission on July 28, 1967, while rioting was still underway in Detroit, Michigan. Mounting civil unrest since 1965 had resulted in riots in the black and Latino neighborhoods of major U.S. cities, including Los Angeles (Watts riots of 1965), Chicago (Division Street Riots of 1966, the first Puerto Rican riot in U.S. history); and Newark (1967 Newark riots). In his remarks upon signing the order to establish the commission, Johnson asked for answers to three basic questions about the riots: "What happened? Why did it happen? What can be done to prevent it from happening again and again?" It was widely believed by the general public (without any supporting evidence) that the riots were part of an organized effort.

Operations 
According to the Kerner Report, there would also be two advisory panels for the commission: the National Advisory Panel on Insurance in Riot-Affected Areas (commonly known as the Hughes Panel) and the Advisory Panel on Private Enterprise. The Hughes Panel would look at how to recover from the riots as opposed to the causes that the Kerner Report was supposed to find. Insurance companies leaving areas affected by the riots would slow down attempts to recover. The Hughes Panel would try to primarily find ways to make insurance accessible to those who were affected by the riots. With the Advisory Panel on Private Enterprise, the Kerner Report would describe its function as being: "to assist the Commission and staff in formulating recommendations for increasing employment opportunities."

In the first few months of the commission's workings while commissioners were listening to witnesses of violence and going to areas affected by the riots, David Ginsburg and Victor Palmieri would organize their staff into field teams to get information on cities. They would end up reporting back that there was continued racial discrimination along with a "a growing gap" between those who were white and black which "was both overwhelming and irrefutable". Initially Palmieri and Ginsburg planned on gathering large amounts of political and economic data on urban areas and inputting them into a computer to find patterns. However, with time constraints and computers being rather basic at the time this led to it being passed over.

Report summary 

The commission's final work, Report of the National Advisory Commission on Civil Disorders or Kerner Report, was issued on February 29, 1968, after seven months of investigation. The report became an instant bestseller, and more than two million Americans bought copies of the 426-page document. Its primary finding was that the riots resulted from black and Latino frustration at the lack of economic opportunity. Martin Luther King Jr. pronounced the report a "physician's warning of approaching death, with a prescription for life."

The report was made available through the US Government Printing Office. Bantam Books would publish the full report under the same name and sell it being "portable", cheap and in a mass-market paperback book format. The Bantam edition included its own unique paperback and an introduction written by Tom Wicker of The New York Times.

The report berated federal and state governments for failed housing, education, and social-service policies. The report also aimed some of its sharpest criticism at the media. "The press has too long basked in a white world looking out of it, if at all, with white men's eyes and white perspective." The report combined governmental statistics and the social sciences into creating written narratives. Although it did document and categorize the disorders it would also  describe "specific policies" relating to the police and justice system, "insurance, the media, and programs of employment, education, welfare, and housing".

The report's best-known passage warned: "Our nation is moving toward two societies, one black, one white—separate and unequal." The report was a strong indictment of white America: "What white Americans have never fully understood — but what the Negro can never forget — is that white society is deeply implicated in the ghetto. White institutions created it, white institutions maintain it, and white society condones it."

Its results suggested that one main cause of urban violence was white racism and suggested that white America bore much of the responsibility for black rioting and rebellion. It called to create new jobs, construct new housing, and put a stop to de facto segregation in order to dismantle the destructive ghetto environment. In order to do so, the report recommended that government programs provide needed services, police forces should be improved by hiring more officers and educating them about their neighborhoods, and, most notably, to invest billions in housing programs aimed at breaking up residential segregation.

Among other points, the commission's suggestions included:

 "Unless there are sharp changes in the factors influencing Negro settlement patterns within metropolitan areas, there is little doubt that the trend toward Negro majorities will continue."
 "Providing employment for the swelling Negro ghetto population will require ...opening suburban residential areas to Negroes and encouraging them to move closer to industrial centers..."
 "[c]ities will have Negro majorities by 1985 and the suburbs ringing them will remain largely all white unless there are major changes in Negro fertility rates, in migration settlement patterns or public policy."
 "[w]e believe that the emphasis of the program should be changed from traditional publicly built slum based high rise projects to smaller units on scattered sites."

The Law Enforcement Assistance Administration released federal funding for local police forces in response. Appointed by Johnson to serve as the commission's executive director, David Ginsburg played a pivotal role in writing the commission's findings.

Findings from the Hughes Panel would end up being published separately from the Kerner Report under a report titled: "Meeting the Insurance Crisis of Our Cities" in January 1968. With the Hughes Panel despite its intended goal of looking at recovery efforts, it would end up making significant findings involving the decline seen in urban areas. It found that insurance not being available was a contributor toward creating the conditions that spawned these civil disturbances. Previously it was thought that insurance not being accessible was a product of the riots. It was found in a survey of 3,000 businesses and homeowners in 6 major cities that 30% of homeowners and 40% of businesses had "faced serious insurance problems".

Reception

Media coverage 
The report would be covered mostly positively by media and received widespread coverage. Media coverage at first mainly looked at the recommendations and the summary it had. After the report had been leaked it was decided by "the White House" that it would try to make the story widely available so The Washington Post could not have the story as an exclusive piece. As the release date was accelerated this meant journalists had to be competitive and lacked the time to understand the report before publicizing its findings.

Conservative news groups did not like the report blaming racism from white people and thought rioters were "let off the hook". The response of black news groups would be mixed towards the report overall. Some black newspapers like the New York Amsterdam News and those they interviewed thought that the report did not have any new findings and was simply mirroring what black people already knew. Others were happy that the report was simply acknowledging racism. At one point, President Johnson would hold a meeting with editors and publishers from the African American press saying that the report had "done more bad than good" but it had been one of the most significant report given to Johnson since becoming president. Johnson would say that the "bad" part of this report was a funding plan not being incorporated to put the suggestions into action.

Public opinion 
In a Gallup poll conducted on February 29, respondents were asked if they thought the nation was moving into two different societies as stated by the report. 36% of all US adults agreed, 52% would disagree while 13% would express no opinion.

Political response 
Prior to the release of the report, recommendations made by the commission would be leaked to the Los Angeles Times which published an article about it on February 25. The full report would be published in The Washington Post "a week ahead of an embargo that restricted publication and broadcast" before President Johnson could get an actual chance to read the report. Johnson was furious over this happening and refused to publicly comment on the report for close to a month and when he did on March 22 at a press conference he would state he was satisfied with the report. Privately, Johnson did not like the report. He thought it had ignored the accomplishments made during his presidential administration to address inequality and thought it had fallen short on how to finance suggestions made by the committee. Johnson believed that Lindsay had imposed his liberal views and will toward the commission.

Johnson had a slow response compared to that of Vice President Hubert Humphrey who said in a speech at Florida State University that: "If this nation can afford to spend $30 billion to put a man on the moon, it can afford to spend what it takes to put a man on his feet right here on earth" and "It's not enough just to open the doors. You also have to help the people walk through those doors”. Politicians like Ronald Reagan and Richard Nixon would criticize the report. Nixon said that the report was giving undue weight on the idea that "...we are in effect a racist society" with Reagan saying that it was not able "to recognize the efforts that have been made by millions of right-thinking people in this country."

Legacy 

President Johnson, who had already pushed through the Civil Rights Act and the Voting Rights Act, largely rejected the Kerner Commission's recommendations. In April 1968, one month after the Kerner report was published, leader Martin Luther King, Jr. was assassinated and rioting of protest and grief broke out in more than 100 cities.

Presidents Richard Nixon, Gerald Ford, Ronald Reagan, and Donald Trump espoused a law and order platform that favored strong policing and suppression of riots. As the report predicted, incidents of police brutality continued to spark riots and protest marches even after the 1960s had ended, including the 1980 Miami riots, 1989 Miami riot, 1992 Los Angeles riots and West Las Vegas riots, 1992 Washington Heights riots, St. Petersburg, Florida riots of 1996, Cincinnati riots of 2001, 2013 Flatbush Riots, 2009 and 2010 riots associated with the shooting of Oscar Grant, 2014 Oakland riots, 2014 Ferguson unrest, 2015 Baltimore protests, 2016 Charlotte riot, 2016 Milwaukee riots, 2017 Anaheim protests, 2017 St. Louis protests and the 2020 George Floyd protests.

Continuation of the Commission 
The Milton S. Eisenhower Foundation (the Eisenhower Foundation) was formed in 1981 to continue the work of the Kerner Commission and of the 1968 National Commission on the Causes and Prevention of Violence (the National Violence Commission).  Kerner Commission Executive Director Ginsburg, Kerner Commissioner and Senator Fred Harris (D, OK) and Kerner Commissioner and Senator Edward Brooke (R, MA) were among the founding trustees of the Eisenhower Foundation.  The Foundation has released 25 year, 30 year and 40 year updates of the Kerner Commission's final report.

To mark the 30th anniversary of the Kerner Report, the Eisenhower Foundation in 1998 sponsored two complementary reports, The Millennium Breach and Locked in the Poorhouse. The Millennium Breach, co-authored by commissioner Harris, found the racial divide had grown in the subsequent years with inner city unemployment at crisis levels.
The Millennium Breach found that most of the decade that followed the Kerner Report, America made progress on the principal fronts the report dealt with: race, poverty, and inner cities. Then progress stopped and in some ways reversed by a series of economic shocks and trends and the government's action and inaction.

Harris reported in Locked in the Poorhouse, "Today, thirty years after the Kerner Report, there is more poverty in America, it is deeper, blacker and browner than before, and it is more concentrated in the cities, which have become America's poorhouses."

Criticism 
At a 1998 lecture commemorating the 30th anniversary of the report, Stephan Thernstrom, a conservative voice and a professor of history at Harvard University, argued: "Because the commission took for granted that the riots were the fault of white racism, it would have been awkward to have had to confront the question of why liberal Detroit blew up while Birmingham and other Southern cities — where conditions for blacks were infinitely worse — did not. Likewise, if the problem was white racism, why didn't the riots occur in the 1930s, when prevailing white racial attitudes were far more barbaric than they were in the 1960s?"

Others refute this criticism by pointing to the importance of expectations; in Alabama and other states black people could only survive by "knowing their place", in the North black people expected fair treatment. In broader writings on revolution, this has been referred to as the Tocqueville effect or paradox.

Commission and advisory panel members

Commission 
Otto Kerner, Governor of Illinois and chair
John Lindsay, Mayor of New York and vice chairman
Edward Brooke, Senator (R-MA)
Fred R. Harris, Senator (D-OK)
James Corman, Congressman (D-CA)
William McCulloch, Congressman (R-OH)
Charles Thornton, Founder of defense contractor Litton Industries
Roy Wilkins, executive director of the NAACP
I.W. Abel, President of United Steelworkers of America
Herbert Turner Jenkins, Police chief, Atlanta, Georgia
Katherine Graham Peden, Commissioner of Commerce, Kentucky
David Ginsburg, Commission Executive Director appointed by President Johnson

Advisory panels

Hughes Panel 

 Richard J. Hughes, chairman
 William Scranton, vice chairman
 Frank L. Farrell
 A. Addison Roberts
 George S. Harris
 Walter Washington
 Frank M. Wozencraft

Advisory Panel on Private Enterprise 

 Charles Thornton, chairman
 John Leland Atwood
 Walter E. Hoadley
 Martin R. Gainsbrugh
 Louis F. Polk, Jr.
 Lawrence M. Stone

See also
Moynihan Report
President's Commission on Campus Unrest (Scranton Commission)
Investigation of the Watts Riots by the McCone Commission
Educational inequality in Southeast Michigan
Cleveland: Now!

References

Further reading
Gillon, Steven M. (2018). Separate and Unequal: The Kerner Commission and the Unraveling of American Liberalism, Basic Books, ; .

External links
 "Report of the National Advisory Commission on Civil Disorders, Summary of Report, Introduction"
 The Kerner Commission Report, 1967

 National Advisory Commission On Civil Disorders, Report (U.S. Dept of Justice)
 The Kerner Report Revisited; final report and background papers, by Assembly on the Kerner Report Revisited (1970 : Allerton House); ed, Meranto, Philip J. 
 
 
 
 

1967 establishments in the United States
Organizations established in 1967
Public inquiries
Urban decay in the United States
United States Presidential Commissions
History of African-American civil rights
Civil rights movement
1968 in the United States
Presidency of Lyndon B. Johnson
Reports of the United States government
Long, hot summer of 1967